Chapel Hill is an unincorporated community in Douglas County, in the U.S. state of Georgia.

History
A post office called Chapel Hill was established in 1872, and remained in operation until 1903. The community's name most likely is a transfer from Chapel Hill, North Carolina.

References

Unincorporated communities in Douglas County, Georgia
Unincorporated communities in Georgia (U.S. state)